The Mesonacinae comprise an extinct subfamily of trilobites that lived during the Botomian, found in North-America, Greenland and North-Western Scotland. The two genera in this subfamily are Mesonacis and Mesolenellus.

References

External links
Photo of M. vermontanus
Trilobite info

Olenellidae
Cambrian trilobites
Cambrian Series 2 first appearances
Cambrian Series 2 extinctions
Arthropod subfamilies